Joško Vidošević (11 January 1935 – 10 August 1990), nicknamed Jole, was a Croatian footballer. He played for both Yugoslavia and Croatia at international level.

Club career
A native of Split, Vidošević joined local side Hajduk Split as a youngster in 1949 and debuted for the first team squad in 1952. He went on to spend the next 10 years with the club, appearing in a total of 349 games and scored 228 goals (including 143 appearances and 63 goals in the Yugoslav First League). During his time at Hajduk he also helped the club win the 1952 and 1954–55 national championships.

In 1962 he left the club and had brief stints with local rivals RNK Split in 1963 and at Swiss side Lugano in 1964, when he retired from active football due to illness. He later worked in Hajduk's club management and served as chairman of Hajduk between June 1985 and November 1986.

International career
Vidošević was capped for Yugoslavia three times in 1955 and was a member of the squad which won silver medal at the 1956 Summer Olympics in Melbourne. He also appeared for PR Croatia in an unofficial friendly against Indonesia held in Zagreb on 12 September 1956.

References

External links
 
Joško Vidošević at the Serbia national football team website

1935 births
1990 deaths
Footballers from Split, Croatia
Association football forwards
Yugoslav footballers
Yugoslavia international footballers
Croatian footballers
Croatia international footballers
Dual internationalists (football)
Footballers at the 1956 Summer Olympics
Olympic footballers of Yugoslavia
Olympic silver medalists for Yugoslavia
Medalists at the 1956 Summer Olympics
HNK Hajduk Split players
RNK Split players
FC Lugano players
Yugoslav First League players
Yugoslav expatriate footballers
Expatriate footballers in Switzerland
Yugoslav expatriate sportspeople in Switzerland
Burials at Lovrinac Cemetery